The following is a list of players and managers (*), both past and current, who appeared at least in one regular season game for the Chicago White Sox franchise.

Players in Bold are members of the National Baseball Hall of Fame.

Players in Italics have had their numbers retired by the team.


A

 David Aardsma
 Jeff Abbott
 Jim Abbott
 Shawn Abner
 Cal Abrams
 José Abreu
 Fritz Ackley
 Cy Acosta
 José Acosta
 Bill Adair *
 Jerry Adair
 Bobby Adams
 Doug Adams
 Herb Adams
 Grady Adkins
 Jon Adkins
 Tommie Agee
 Juan Agosto
 Al Alburquerque
 Scotty Alcock
 Dick Allen
 Hank Allen
 Lloyd Allen
 Neil Allen
 Bill Almon
 Witto Aloma
Roberto Alomar
 Sandy Alomar Sr.
 Sandy Alomar Jr.
 Yonder Alonso
 Dave Altizer
 Nick Altrock
 Luis Alvarado
 Wilson Álvarez
 Brian N. Anderson
 Bryan Anderson
 Hal Anderson
 John Anderson
 Larry Anderson
 Tim Anderson
 Mike Andrews
 Luis Andújar
 Luis Aparicio
 Pete Appleton
 Luke Appling
 Maurice Archdeacon
 Rudy Árias
 Charlie Armbruster
 Gerry Arrigo
 Cody Asche
 Ken Ash
 Paul Assenmacher
 Jake Atz
 Chick Autry
 Earl Averill Jr.
 Alex Avila
 Luis Avilán
 Dylan Axelrod

B

 Stan Bahnsen
 Harold Baines
 Jeff Bajenaru
 Floyd Baker
 Howard Baker
 Dave Baldwin
 James Baldwin
 Alan Bannister
 Floyd Bannister
 Manny Bañuelos
 Lorenzo Barceló
 Charlie Barnabe
 Bob Barnes
 Red Barnes
 Rich Barnes
 Salomé Barojas
 Bill Barrett
 Francisco Barrios
 Cuke Barrows
 Les Bartholomew
 Chris Bassitt
 Earl Battey
 Jim Battle
 Matt Batts
 Frank Baumann
 Jim Baumer
 Ross Baumgarten
 Johnny Beall
 Ted Beard
 Gene Bearden
 Chris Beck
 Gordon Beckham
 Kevin Beirne
 Ollie Bejma
 Tim Belcher
 Ronald Belisario
 Gary Bell
 George Bell
 Kevin Bell
 Ralph Bell
 Albert Belle
 Esteban Beltré
Chief Bender
 Yamil Benítez
 Joe Benz
 Jason Bere
 Moe Berg
 Boze Berger
 Joe Berger
 Marty Berghammer
 Tony Bernazard
 Dennis Berran
 Charlie Berry
 Claude Berry
 Ken Berry
 Neil Berry
 Mike Bertotti
 Wilson Betemit
 Terry Bevington *
 Rocky Biddle
 Charlie Biggs
 John Bischoff
 Hi Bithorn
 Jeff Bittiger
 Bill Black
 Charlie Blackburn
 Lena Blackburne *
 George Blackerby
 Ossie Blanco
 Homer Blankenship
 Ted Blankenship
 Bruno Block
 Ron Blomberg
 Lu Blue
 Geoff Blum
 Milt Bocek
 Ping Bodie
 Bob Boken
 Greg Bollo
 Rodney Bolton
 Bobby Bonds
 Bobby Bonilla
 Zeke Bonura
 Buddy Booker
 Ike Boone
 Ray Boone
 Joe Borchard
 Frenchy Bordagaray
 Pat Borders
 Glenn Borgmann
 Babe Borton
 Thad Bosley
 Daryl Boston
 Billy Bowers
 Grant Bowler
 Emmett Bowles
 Red Bowser
 Bob Boyd
 Ken Boyer
 Harry Boyles
 Buddy Bradford
 Chad Bradford
 Fred Bradley
 Phil Bradley
 Scott Bradley
 Tom Bradley
 Doug Brady
 Dave Brain
 Rob Brantly
 Fred Bratschi
 Ángel Bravo
 Garland Braxton
 Jim Breazeale
 Tom Brennan
 Jim Breton
 Ken Brett
 Alan Brice
 Jim Brideweser
 Bunny Brief
 Chuck Brinkman
 Lance Broadway
 Jack Brohamer
 Jim Brosnan
 Clint Brown
 Delos Brown
 Dick Brown
 Hal Brown
 Joe Brown
 George Browne
 Jack Bruner
 Brian Bruney
 Warren Brusstar
 Hal Bubser
 Mark Buehrle
 Don Buford
 Ryan Bukvich
 Aaron Bummer
 Zack Burdi
 Smoky Burgess
 Jamie Burke
 Jimmy Burke
 Ellis Burks
 Bill Burns
 Britt Burns
 Joe Burns
 Ryan Burr
 Jim Busby
 Donie Bush *
 John Buzhardt
 Harry Byrd
 Bobby Byrne
 Jerry Byrne
 Tommy Byrne

C

 Melky Cabrera
 Orlando Cabrera
 Leon Cadore
 Bob Cain
 Sugar Cain
 George Caithamer
 Ivan Calderón
 Earl Caldwell
 Nixey Callahan *
 Johnny Callison
 Mike Cameron
 Bruce Campbell
 John Cangelosi
 José Canseco
 Pat Caraway
 Andy Carey
 Cisco Carlos
Steve Carlton
 Eddie Carnet
 D. J. Carrasco
 Alex Carrasquel
 Chico Carrasquel
 Cam Carreon
 Clay Carroll
 Scott Carroll
 Jeff Carter
 Mike Caruso
 Chuck Cary
 Raúl Casanova
 Norm Cash
 Larry Casian
 Carlos Castillo
 Tony Castillo
 Welington Castillo
 Vince Castino
 Paul Castner
 Ramón Castro
 Simón Castro
 Danny Cater
 Wayne Causey
 Phil Cavarretta
 Dylan Cease
 Domingo Cedeño
 Xavier Cedeño
 Bob Chakales
 Bill Chamberlain
 Joe Chamberlain
 Ben Chapman
 Harry Chappas
 Larry Chappell
 Hal Chase
 Italo Chelini
 Felix Chouinard
 Chief Chouneau
 McKay Christensen
 Bob Christian
 Steve Christmas
 Loyd Christopher
 Eddie Cicotte
 Alex Cintrón
 Bill Cissell
 Ralph Citarella
 Bud Clancy
 Allie Clark
 Bryan Clark
 Pep Clark
 Grey Clarke
 Royce Clayton
 Chris Clemons
 Maikel Cleto
 Tyler Clippard
 Gil Coan
 Dave Cochrane
 Rich Coggins
 Rocky Colavito
 Mike Colbern
 Bert Cole
 Willis Cole
 Ray Coleman
Eddie Collins *
 Shano Collins
 Zack Collins
 Álex Colomé
 Bartolo Colón
 Bob Coluccio
 Ramón Conde
 Jocko Conlan
 Sarge Connally
 Bill Connelly
 Merv Connors
 Sandy Consuegra
 José Contreras
 Nardi Contreras
 Dennis Cook
 Cecil Coombs
 Joey Cora
 Ryan Cordell
 Jimmy Cordero
 Wil Cordero
 Ed Corey
 Roy Corhan
 Ed Correa
 Red Corriden *
 Jess Cortazzo
 Neal Cotts
 Clint Courtney
 Harry Courtney
 Dylan Covey
 Wes Covington
 Joe Cowley
 Bill Cox
 Ernie Cox
 George Cox
 Les Cox
 Roy Crabb
 Rod Craig
 Jesse Crain
 Gavvy Cravath
 Joe Crede
 Jerry Crider
 Garrett Crochet
 Chris Cron
 Buck Crouse
 Henry Cruz
 Julio Cruz
 Nelson Cruz
 Todd Cruz
 Tommy Cruz
 Tony Cuccinello
 Charlie Cuellar
 Tim Cullen
 Dick Culler
 Joe Cunningham
 Guy Curtright
 Mike Cvengros

D

 Pete Daglia
 Jerry Dahlke
 Bruce Dal Canton
 Mark Dalesandro
 Tom Daly (C)
 Tom Daly (2B)
 Pat Daneker
 Dave Danforth
 Tyler Danish
 John Danks
 Jordan Danks
 Vic Darensbourg
 Matt Davidson
 Danny Darwin
 Jeff Darwin
 Wally Dashiell
 Brian Daubach
 Joe Davenport
 Lum Davenport
 Ben Davis
 Dixie Davis
George Davis
 Ike Davis
 Joel Davis
 John Davis
 Tommy Davis
 Bill Dawley
 Dewon Day
 Alejandro De Aza
 Dave DeBusschere
 Mike DeGerick
 José DeLeón
 Flame Delhi
 Jason Dellaero
 Nicky Delmonico
 Jim Delsing
 Joe DeMaestri
 Ray Demmitt
 Drew Denson
 Bucky Dent
 Sam Dente
 Jim Derrington
 Joe DeSa
 Odrisamer Despaigne
 Ross Detwiler
 Mike Devereaux
 Bernie DeViveiros
 Al DeVormer
 Félix Díaz
 Mike Diaz
 Rob Dibble
 George Dickey
 Johnny Dickshot
 Bill Dietrich
 Steve Dillard
 Bob Dillinger
 Miguel Diloné
 John Dobb
 Jess Dobernic
 Joe Dobson
Larry Doby *
 Cozy Dolan
 Jiggs Donahue
 Dick Donovan
 Harry Dorish
 Charlie Dorman
 Richard Dotson
 Patsy Dougherty
 Octavio Dotel
 Tom Dougherty
 Phil Douglas
 Brian Downing
 Scott Downs
 Doug Drabek
 Moe Drabowsky
 Brian Drahman
 Kelly Dransfeldt
 Tom Drees
 Walt Dropo
 Cecil Duff
Hugh Duffy *
 Dan Dugan
 Gus Dundon
 Davey Dunkle
 Adam Dunn
 Mike Dunne
 Frank Dupee
 Ed Durham
 Ray Durham
 Jerry Dybzinski
 Jermaine Dye
 Jimmie Dykes *

E

 George Earnshaw
 Ted Easterly
 Adam Eaton
 Vallie Eaves
 Don Eddy
 Mike Eden
 Paul Edmondson
 Hank Edwards
 Jim Joe Edwards
 Wayne Edwards
 Tom Egan
 Jack Egbert
 Ike Eichrodt
 Cal Eldred
 Lee Elia
 Bob Elliott
 Sammy Ellis
 Roy Elsh
 Alan Embree
 Slim Embrey
 Adam Engel
 Charlie English
 Del Ennis
 George Enright
 Mutz Ens
 Joe Erautt
 Chico Escárrega
 Eduardo Escobar
 Sammy Esposito
 Mark Esser
 Jim Essian
 Art Evans
 Bill Evans
 Red Evans
 Carl Everett
Johnny Evers *
 Sam Ewing
 Scott Eyre

F

Red Faber
 Jorge Fábregas
 Ferris Fain
 Bibb Falk
 Bob Fallon
 Bob Farley
 Ed Farmer
 Danny Farquhar
 Kerby Farrell
 Joe Fautsch
 Dutch Fehring
 Happy Felsch
 Hod Fenner
 Ed Fernandes
 Alex Fernández
 Don Ferrarese
 Clarence Fieber
 Josh Fields
 Lou Fiene
 Pete Filson
 Steve Fireovid
 Bill Fischer
 Carl Fischer
 Eddie Fisher
 Jack Fisher
 Carlton Fisk
 Patsy Flaherty
 Tom Flanigan
 John Flannery
 Roy Flaskamper
 Scott Fletcher
 Tyler Flowers
 Gavin Floyd
 Josh Fogg
 Marv Foley
 Lew Fonseca *
 Chad Fonville
 Gene Ford
 Tom Fordham
 Brook Fordyce
 Happy Foreman
 Mike Fornieles
 Terry Forster
 Tim Fortugno
 George Foster
 Matt Foster
 Pop Foster
 Bob Fothergill
 Keith Foulke
 Jack Fournier
 Nellie Fox
 Ken Frailing
 Frank Francisco
 Julio Franco
 Tito Francona
 Caleb Frare
 Jason Frasor
 Lou Frazier
 Todd Frazier
 Vic Frazier
 Marvin Freeman
 Gene Freese
 Jake Freeze
 Charlie French
 Ray French
 Dave Frost
 Jace Fry
 Kosuke Fukudome
 Carson Fulmer
 Liz Funk

G

 Frank Gabler
 Dave Gallagher
 Phil Gallivan
 Oscar Gamble
 Chick Gandil
 Avisaíl García
 Freddy García
 Leury García
 Mike Garcia
 Ramón García
 Willy García
 Jon Garland
 Dustin Garneau
 Ralph Garr
 Hank Garrity
 Ned Garvin
 Milt Gaston
 Joe Gates
 Pete Gebrian
 Jim Geddes
 Johnny Gerlach
 Al Gettel
 Chris Getz
 George Gick
 Mark Gilbert
 Brian J. Giles
 Conor Gillaspie
 Claral Gillenwater
 Bob Gillespie
 Héctor Giménez
 Joe Ginsberg
 Matt Ginter
 Lucas Giolito
 Kid Gleason
 Jerry Don Gleaton
 Ross Gload
 Gary Glover
 Jimmy Gobble
 Bill Gogolewski
 Ryan Goins
 Brad Goldberg
 Gordon Goldsberry
 Stan Goletz
 Jeanmar Gómez
 Alfredo González
 Andy González
 Luis González
 Miguel González (catcher)
 Miguel González (pitcher)
 Romy González
 Wilbur Good
 John Goodell
 Billy Goodman
 Brian Goodwin
 Jim Goodwin
 Tom Gordon
 Rich Gossage
 Johnny Grabowski
 Tony Graffanino
 Roy Graham
 Johnny Groth
 Yasmani Grandal
 Wayne Granger
 Jimmy Grant
 Jeff Gray
 Lorenzo Gray
 Ted Gray
 Craig Grebeck
 Danny Green
 Tyler Greene
 Paul Gregory
 Clark Griffith *
 Jason Grilli
 Ken Griffey Jr.
 Ross Grimsley
 Marv Grissom
 Ernest Groth
 Johnny Groth
 Orval Grove
 Frank Grube
 Javy Guerra
 Ozzie Guillén *
 Tom Gulley
 Randy Gumpert
 Don Gutteridge *

H

 Bert Haas
 Mule Haas
 Warren Hacker
 Bump Hadley
 Mickey Haefner
 Charlie Haeger
 Bud Hafey
 Ed Hahn
 Jerry Hairston, Sr.
 Sammy Hairston
 Chet Hajduk
 Joe Hall
 Toby Hall
 Jack Hallett
 Bill Hallman
 Billy Hamilton
 Dave Hamilton
 Ian Hamilton
 Jack Hamilton
 Steve Hamilton
 Atlee Hammaker
 Ralph Hamner
 Fred Hancock
 Ron Hansen
 Don Hanski
 Alen Hanson
 John Happenny
 Pat Hardgrove
 Jack Hardy
 Lucas Harrell
 Dave Harris
 Spencer Harris
 Willie Harris
 Earl Harrist
 Jack Harshman
 Hub Hart
 Fred Hartman
 Zaza Harvey
 Ziggy Hasbrook
 Ron Hassey
 Fred Hatfield
 Grady Hatton
 Frankie Hayes
 Jackie Hayes
 Joe Haynes
 Bill Heath
 Deunte Heath
 Spencer Heath
 Mike Heathcott
 Val Heim
 Woodie Held
 Scott Hemond
 Frank Hemphill
 Joe Henderson
 Ken Henderson
 Liam Hendriks
 Butch Henline
 Dutch Henry
 Ray Herbert
 Ed Herrmann
 Dustin Hermanson
 César Hernández
 Orlando Hernández
 Pedro Hernández
 Roberto Hernández
 Rudy Hernández
 Kelvin Herrera
 Art Herring
 Ed Herrmann
 Mike Hershberger
 Joe Heving
 Mike Heydon
 Greg Hibbard
 Kevin Hickey
 Charlie Hickman
 Jim Hicks
 Joe Hicks
 Bill Higdon
 Dennis Higgins
 Donnie Hill
 Ken Hill
 Marc Hill
 Shawn Hillegas
 Rich Hinton
 Myril Hoag
 Oris Hockett
 Johnny Hodapp
 Shovel Hodge
 Ralph Hodgin
 Dutch Hoffman
 Guy Hoffman
 Ken Holcombe
 Derek Holland
 Al Hollingsworth
 David Holmberg
 Ducky Holmes
Harry Hooper
 Gail Hopkins
 Marty Hopkins
 Joe Horlen
 Ricky Horton
 Ken Hottman
 Charlie Hough
 Joe Hovlik
 Bruce Howard
 Chris Howard
 Fred Howard
 Dixie Howell
 Dann Howitt
 Bobby Howry
 Dummy Hoy
 LaMarr Hoyt
 Daniel Hudson
 Hal Hudson
 Orlando Hudson
 Frank Huelsman
 Mike Huff
 Ed Hughes
 Jim Hughes
 Tim Hulett
 Philip Humber
 Johnny Humphries
 Bill Hunnefield
 Steve Huntz
 Ira Hutchinson

I

 Tadahito Iguchi
 Gregory Infante
 Frank Isbell

J

 Austin Jackson
 Bo Jackson
 Charlie Jackson
 Darrin Jackson
 Edwin Jackson
 Mike Jackson
 Ron Jackson
 Shoeless Joe Jackson
 Elmer Jacobs
 Otto Jacobs
 Pat Jacquez
 Bill James
 Bob James
 Jerry Janeski
 Jon Jay
 Jesse Jefferson
 Irv Jeffries
 John Jenkins
 Joe Jenkins
 Bobby Jenks
 Dan Jennings
 Johnny Jeter
 Shawn Jeter
 D'Angelo Jiménez
 Eloy Jiménez
 Tommy John
 Pete Johns
 Bart Johnson
 Charles Johnson
 Connie Johnson
 Dan Johnson
 Dane Johnson
 Darrell Johnson
 Deron Johnson
 Don Johnson
 Ellis Johnson
 Erik Johnson
 Ernie Johnson
 Johnny Johnson
 Lamar Johnson
 Lance Johnson
 Larry Johnson
 Mark L. Johnson
 Randy Johnson
 Stan Johnson
 Jimmy Johnston
 Jay Johnstone
 Stan Jok
 Smead Jolley
 Al Jones
 Andruw Jones
 Barry Jones
 Charlie Jones
 Cleon Jones
 Davy Jones
 Deacon Jones
 Fielder Jones *
 Jake Jones
 Nate Jones
 Sad Sam Jones
 Stacy Jones
 Steve Jones
 Tex Jones
 Bubber Jonnard
 Rip Jordan
 Tom Jordan
 Duane Josephson
 Ted Jourdan
 Mike Joyce
 Howie Judson

K

 Jim Kaat
 Tommy Kahnle
 Frank Kalin
 Willie Kamm
 John Kane
 Matt Karchner
 Ron Karkovice
 Jack Katoll
 Charlie Kavanagh
 Steve Kealey
 Pat Keedy
 Bob Keegan
George Kell
 Pat Kelly
 Red Kelly
 Russ Kemmerer
 Steve Kemp
 Bill Kennedy
 Bob Kennedy
 Vern Kennedy
 Dick Kenworthy
 Joe Keough
 Jeff Keppinger
 Gus Keriazakos
 Jim Kern
 Dickie Kerr
 John Kerr
 Don Kessinger
 Brian Keyser
 Joe Kiefer
 Bruce Kimm
 Chad Kimsey
 Ellis Kinder
 Eric King
 Jim King
 Josh Kinney
 Harry Kinzy
 Don Kirkwood
 Joe Kirrene
 Ron Kittle
 Hugo Klaerner
 Fred Klages
 Ed Klepfer
 Ed Klieman
 Joe Klinger
 Ted Kluszewski
 Chris Knapp
 Bill Knickerbocker
 Bobby Knoop
 Jack Knott
 Billy Koch
 Don Kolloway
 Michael Kopech
 Paul Konerko
 Jerry Koosman
 Mark Kotsay
 Fabian Kowalik
 Al Kozar
 Ken Kravec
 Mike Kreevich
 Ralph Kreitz
 Chuck Kress
 Red Kress
 Lou Kretlow
 Chad Kreuter
 Frank Kreutzer
 Rocky Krsnich
 John Kruk
 Jack Kucek
 Joe Kuhel
 Walt Kuhn
 Rusty Kuntz
 Art Kusnyer
 Jerry Kutzler
 Bob Kuzava

L

 Lerrin LaGrow
 Jack Lamabe
 Ryan LaMarre
 Fred Lamlein
 Gene Lamont *
 Dennis Lamp
 Ken Landenberger
 Jim Landis
 Jesse Landrum
 Dick Lane
 Frank Lange
 Paul LaPalme
 Dave LaPoint
 Jack Lapp
 Don Larsen
 Tony La Russa *
 Frank Lary
 Bill Lathrop
 Barry Latman
 Mike LaValliere
 Rudy Law
 Vance Law
 Bob Lawrence
 Brett Lawrie
 Danny Lazar
 Terry Leach
 Carlos Lee
 Thornton Lee
 George Lees
 Charles Leesman
 Ron LeFlore
 Paul Lehner
 Nemo Leibold
 Elmer Leifer
 Dummy Leitner
Bob Lemon *
 Chet Lemon
 Jim Lemon
 Dave Lemonds
 Don Lenhardt
 Eddie Leon
 Rudy Leopold
 Ted Lepcio
 Dixie Leverett
 Al Levine
 Darren Lewis
 Jeff Liefer
 Brent Lillibridge
 Shane Lindsay
 Bill Lindsey
 Doug Lindsey
 Chuck Lindstrom
 Matt Lindstrom
 Scott Linebrink
 Francisco Liriano
 Rymer Liriano
 Bryan Little
 Dick Littlefield
 Esteban Loaiza
 Bob Locker
 Dario Lodigiani
 Kenny Lofton
 Boone Logan
 Ron Lolich
 Sherm Lollar
 Tim Lollar
 Bill Long
 Jeoff Long
 Jimmie Long
 Dean Look
 Ed Lopat
 Al López
 José López
 Pedro López
 Reynaldo López
 Harry Lord
 Andrew Lorraine
 Mem Lovett
 Jay Loviglio
 Grover Lowdermilk
 Sean Lowe
 Turk Lown
 Donny Lucy
 David Lundquist
 Tony Lupien
 Greg Luzinski
 Sparky Lyle
 Byrd Lynn
 Lance Lynn
 Barry Lyons
 Steve Lyons
 Ted Lyons
 Jim Lyttle

M

 Mike MacDougal
 Robert Machado
 Frank Mack
 Rob Mackowiak
 Ed Madjeski
 Jim Magnuson
 George Magoon
 Joe Magrane
 Bob Mahoney
 Hank Majeski
 Jule Mallonee
 Eddie Malone
 Gordon Maltzberger
 Carl Manda
 Leo Mangum
 Johnny Mann
 Fred Manrique
 Jerry Manuel *
 Moxie Manuel
 Ravelo Manzanillo
 Johnny Marcum
 Jhan Mariñez
 Marty Marion *
 Dick Marlowe
 Isidro Márquez
 Jeffrey Marquez
 Fred Marsh
 Evan Marshall
 Willard Marshall
 Dámaso Marte
 J. C. Martin
 Joe Martin
 Morrie Martin
 Norberto Martín
 Carlos Martínez
 Dave Martinez
 Silvio Martínez
 Randy Martz
 Phil Masi
 Nick Masset
 John Matias
 Wally Mattick
 Mark Mauldin
 Charlie Maxwell
 Carlos May
 Milt May
 Jacob May
 Lee Maye
 Erskine Mayer
 Wally Mayer
 Jack McAleese
 Jim McAnany
 Pryor McBee
 Ken McBride
 Dick McCabe
 Brian McCall
 James McCann
 Brandon McCarthy
 Tom McCarthy
 Kirk McCaskill
 Harvey McClellan
 Amby McConnell
 Mike McCormick
 Tommy McCraw
 Rodney McCray
 Harry McCurdy
 Jim McDonald
 Jack McDowell
 Chuck McElroy
 Ed McFarland
 Herm McFarland
 Ed McGhee
 Lynn McGlothen
 Jim McGlothlin
 Tom McGuire
 Stover McIlwain
 Matty McIntyre
 Hal McKain
 Joel McKeon
 Rich McKinney
 Polly McLarry
 Cal McLish
 Sam McMackin
 Don McMahon
 Fred McMullin
 Eric McNair
 Jerry McNertney
 Dallas McPherson
 Doug McWeeny
 Sam Mele
 Paul Meloan
 Bill Melton
 Bob Melvin
 Danny Mendick
 Lloyd Merriman
 Sam Mertes
 Matt Merullo
 Bobby Messenger
 Catfish Metkovich
 William Metzig
 Alex Metzler
 Billy Meyer
 George Meyer
 Cass Michaels
 John Michaelson
 Aaron Miles
 Lastings Milledge
 Bob Miller
 Corky Miller
 Frank Miller
 Jake Miller
 Juan Minaya
 Minnie Miñoso
 Willy Miranda
 Roy Mitchell
 George Mogridge
 Gustavo Molina
 Bob Molinaro
 Richie Moloney
 Yoan Moncada
 Larry Monroe
 Aurelio Monteagudo
 Agustín Montero
 Barry Moore
 Jim Moore
 Jimmy Moore
 Junior Moore
 Randy Moore
 Ray Moore
 Rich Morales
 Bill Moran
 Ray Morehart
 Brent Morel
 George Moriarty
 Russ Morman
 Bugs Morris
 Jim Morrison
 Jo-Jo Morrissey
 Jerry Moses
 Wally Moses
 Les Moss *
 Don Mossi
 Johnny Mostil
 Glen Moulder
 Lyle Mouton
 Bill Mueller
 Don Mueller
 Greg Mulleavy
 Charlie Mullen
 Eddie Mulligan
 Fran Mullins
 Dominic Mulrenan
 Arnie Muñoz
 José Muñoz
 Steve Mura
 Danny Murphy
 Eddie Murphy
 George Murray
 Tony Muser
 Brett Myers
 Mike Myers
 Aaron Myette

N

 Bill Nagel
 Bill Nahorodny
 Frank Naleway
 Omar Narváez
 Cotton Nash
 Jaime Navarro
 Bernie Neis
 Andy Nelson
 Gene Nelson
 Jeff Nelson
 Rocky Nelson
 Roger Nelson
 Jack Ness
 Dan Neumeier
 Warren Newson
 Gus Niarhos
 Don Nicholas
 Reid Nichols
 Dave Nicholson
 Scott Nielsen
 Bob Nieman
 Randy Niemann
 Adrián Nieto
 Jayson Nix
 Héctor Noesí
 Tim Nordbrook
 Wayne Nordhagen
 Bill Norman
 Ron Northey
 Greg Norton
 Iván Nova
 Win Noyes
 Jhonny Núñez
 Chris Nyman
 Jerry Nyman
 Nyls Nyman

O

 Buck O'Brien
 Charlie O'Brien
 Syd O'Brien
 Tom O'Malley
 Bill O'Neill
 Emmett O'Neill
 Dennis O'Toole
 Jim O'Toole
 Blue Moon Odom
 Will Ohman
 Miguel Olivo
 Ray Olmedo
 Fred Olmstead
 Brian Omogrosso
 Magglio Ordóñez
 Joe Orengo
 Jorge Orta
 José Ortiz
 Ozzie Osborn
 Josh Osich
 Dan Osinski
 Claude Osteen
 Red Ostergard
 Johnny Ostrowski
 Antonio Osuna
 Jim Otten
 Frank Owen
 Marv Owen
 Frank Owens
 Jerry Owens
 Pablo Ozuna

P

 Tom Paciorek
 Del Paddock
 Daniel Palka
 Donn Pall
 José Paniagua
 Al Papai
 Frank Papish
 Freddy Parent
 Kelly Paris
 Jim Parque
 Casey Parsons
 Johnny Pasek
 Dan Pasqua
 Ham Patterson
 Ken Patterson
 Reggie Patterson
 Roy Patterson
 Josh Paul
 Felipe Paulino
 Don Pavletich
 John Pawlowski
 Fred Payne
 George Payne
 Ike Pearson
 Jake Peavy
 Roger Peckinpaugh
 Mike Pelfrey
 Jesús Peña
 Tony Peña (catcher)
 Tony Peña (pitcher)
 Elmer Pence
 Rusty Pence
 Jack Perconte
 Mélido Pérez
 Timo Pérez
 John Perkovich
 Len Perme
 Herb Perry
 Stan Perzanowski
 Gary Peters
 Rube Peters
 Adam Peterson
 Buddy Peterson
 Jake Petricka
 Josh Phegley
 Ray Phelps
 Dave Philley
 Bubba Phillips
 Heath Phillips
 Taylor Phillips
 Tony Phillips
 Wiley Piatt
 Billy Pierce
 Marino Pieretti
 Juan Pierre
 A. J. Pierzynski
 Tony Piet
 Al Pilarcik
 Babe Pinelli
 Skip Pitlock
 Juan Pizarro
 Whitey Platt
 Scott Podsednik
 Cliff Politte
 Howie Pollet
 John Pomorski
 Aaron Poreda
 Irv Porter
 Mike Porzio
 Bob Poser
 Bob Powell
 Frank Pratt
 Bob Priddy
 Bret Prinz
 Red Proctor
 Mike Proly
 Ron Pruitt
 Greg Pryor
 Bill Pulsipher
 David Purcey
 Pid Purdy
 Billy Purtell
 Zach Putnam
 J. J. Putz

Q

 Jim Qualls
 Tom Qualters
 Carlos Quentin
 Lee Quillen
 Finners Quinlan
 Jack Quinn
 José Quintana
 Jamie Quirk

R

 Rip Radcliff
 Don Rader
 Doug Rader *
 Scott Radinsky
 Pat Ragan
Tim Raines
 Alexei Ramírez
 Julio Ramírez
 Manny Ramirez
 Sap Randall
 Earl Rapp
 Fred Rath, Sr.
 Morrie Rath
 Jon Rauch
 Claude Raymond
 Buck Redfern
 Gary Redus
 Addison Reed
 A. J. Reed
 Ron Reed
 Phil Regan
 Rick Reichardt
 Barney Reilly
 Steve Renko
 Tony Rensa
 Jerry Reuss
 Carl Reynolds
 Danny Reynolds
 Bobby Rhawn
 Hal Rhyne
 Dennis Ribant
 Danny Richar
 Clayton Richard
 Lee Richard
 Paul Richards *
 Marv Rickert
 Johnny Riddle
 André Rienzo
 Dave Righetti
 Johnny Rigney
 Alex Ríos
 Armando Ríos
 Swede Risberg
 David Riske
 Todd Ritchie
 Jim Rivera
 Tink Riviere
 Todd Rizzo
 Bert Roberge
 Luis Robert
 Charlie Robertson
 David Robertson
 Mike Robertson
 Billy Jo Robidoux
 Aaron Robinson
 Dewey Robinson
 Eddie Robinson
 Floyd Robinson
 Les Rock
 Carlos Rodon
 Aurelio Rodríguez
 Héctor Rodríguez
 Liu Rodríguez
 Saul Rogovin
 George Rohe
 Johnny Romano
 Vicente Romo
 Bruce Rondón
 Gilberto Rondón
 José Rondón
 Phil Roof
 Bob Roselli
 Lou Rosenberg
 Steve Rosenberg
 Larry Rosenthal
 Buck Ross
 Marv Rotblatt
 Braggo Roth
 Frank Roth
 Jack Rothrock
 Gene Rounsaville
Edd Roush
 Aaron Rowand
 Pants Rowland *
 Jerry Royster
 Don Rudolph
 Muddy Ruel
 José Ruiz
 Scott Ruffcorn
Red Ruffing
 Bob Rush
 Adam Russell
 John Russell
 Reb Russell
 Mark Ryal
 Blondy Ryan
 Connie Ryan

S

 Chris Sabo
 Bob Sadowski
 Olmedo Sáenz
 Tyler Saladino
 Mark Salas
 Luis Salazar
 Chris Sale
 Bill Salkeld
 Jack Salveson
 Ángel Sánchez
 Yolmer Sánchez
 David Sanders
 Scott Sanderson
 Ervin Santana
 Hector Santiago
 Ron Santo
 Sergio Santos
 Nelson Santovenia
 Rich Sauveur
 Carl Sawatski
 Steve Sax
 Rob Scahill
 Jerry Scala
 Randy Scarbery
 Ray Scarborough
 Jeff Schaefer
 Jimmie Schaffer
Ray Schalk *
 Roy Schalk
 Biff Schaller
 Norm Schlueter
 Dave Schmidt
 Scott Schoeneweis
 Ossee Schreckengost
 Hank Schreiber
 Ron Schueler
 Webb Schultz
 Ferdie Schupp
 Jeff Schwarz
 Jim Scoggins
 Herb Score
 Everett Scott
 Jim Scott
 Ray Searage
Tom Seaver
 Don Secrist
 Bob Seeds
 Pat Seerey
 José Segura
 Ricky Seilheimer
 Carey Selph
 Marcus Semien
 Leyson Séptimo
 Luke Sewell
 Bill Sharp
 Al Shaw
 Bob Shaw
 Jeff Shaw
 Merv Shea
 Bud Sheely
 Earl Sheely
 Frank Shellenback
 James Shields
 Joe Shipley
 Art Shires
 Ray Shook
 Bill Shores
 Dave Short
 Clyde Shoun
 Frank Shugart
 Moisés Sierra
 Rubén Sierra
 Roy Sievers
 Frank Sigafoos
 Ken Silvestri
 Al Sima
 Bill Simas
Al Simmons
 Brian Simmons
 Mel Simons
 Harry Simpson
 Chris Singleton
 Mike Sirotka
 Andrew Sisco
 Tommie Sisk
 Jim Siwy
 Bud Sketchley
 Joel Skinner
 Lou Skizas
 Matt Skole
 John Skopec
 Bill Skowron
 Jack Slattery
 Don Slaught
 Roy Smalley
 Joe Smaza
 Al Smith
 Art Smith
 Bob Smith
 Charlie Smith
 Eddie Smith
 Ernie Smith
 Frank Smith
 Harry Smith
 Kevan Smith
 Pop-Boy Smith
 Roxy Snipes
 Scott Snodgress
 Chris Snopek
 Cory Snyder
 John Snyder
 Russ Snyder
 Eric Soderholm
 Eddie Solomon
 Moose Solters
 Joakim Soria
 Sammy Sosa
 Geovany Soto
 Steve Souchock
 Floyd Speer
 Bob Spence
 Jim Spencer
 Tom Spencer
 Ed Spiezio
 Dan Spillner
 Mike Squires
 Marv Staehle
 Gerry Staley
 Lee Stange
 Joe Stanka
 Eddie Stanky *
 Mike T. Stanton
 Matt Stark
 Milt Steengrafe
 Dave Stegman
 Bill Stein
 Hank Steinbacher
 Gene Stephens
 Vern Stephens
 Joe Stephenson
 Bud Stewart
 Chris Stewart
 Frank Stewart
 Jimmy Stewart
 Josh Stewart
 Zach Stewart
 Dave Stieb
 Royle Stillman
 Lee Stine
 Chuck Stobbs
 Tim Stoddard
 Dean Stone
 Steve Stone
 John Stoneham
 Dick Strahs
 Sammy Strang
 Monty Stratton
 Elmer Stricklett
 Jake Striker
 Ed Stroud
 Amos Strunk
 Eric Stults
 George Stumpf
 Tanyon Sturtze
 Joe Sugden
 Billy Sullivan *
 Billiy Sullivan (Jr)
 John Sullivan
 Scott Sullivan
 Eric Surkamp
 Max Surkont
 Harry Suter
 Leo Sutherland
 Dale Sveum
 Evar Swanson
 Karl Swanson
 Anthony Swarzak
 Ryan Sweeney
 Augie Swentor
 Bill Swift
 Nick Swisher

T

 Doug Taitt
 Shingo Takatsu
 Fred Tallbot
 Leo Tankersley
 Lee Tannehill
 Bruce Tanner
 Chuck Tanner *
 Kevin Tapani
 Danny Tartabull
 Bennie Tate
 Ken Tatum
 Fred Tauby
 Leo Taylor
 Michael Taylor
 Wiley Taylor
 Mark Teahen
 Luis Terrero
 Zeb Terry
 Bobby Thigpen
 Frank Thomas
 Larry Thomas
 Leo Thomas
 Tommy Thomas
Jim Thome
 Lee Thompson
 Taylor Thompson
 Tommy Thompson
 Trayce Thompson
 Matt Thornton
 Erick Threets
 Sloppy Thurston
 Dick Tidrow
 Verle Tiefenthaler
 Les Tietje
 Charlie Tilson
 Ron Tingley
 Joe Tipton
 Wayne Tolleson
 Jeff Torborg *
 Earl Torgeson
 Pablo Torrealba
 Carlos Torres
 Rusty Torres
 Clay Touchstone
 Babe Towne
 Sean Tracey
 Chris Tremie
 Mike Tresh
 Ramón Troncoso
 Hal Trosky (Jr.)
 Hal Trosky (Sr.)
 Steve Trout
 Virgil Trucks
 Thurman Tucker
 Jerry Turner
 Tom Turner
 Cy Twombly

U

 Frenchy Uhalt
 Bob Uhl
 Charlie Uhlir
 Cecil Upshaw
 Juan Uribe

V

 Mario Valdéz
 Wilson Valdéz
 José Valentín
 Vito Valentinetti
 Joe Vance
 Pete Varney
 Javier Vázquez
 Donnie Veal
 Pat Veltman
 Robin Ventura *
 John Verhoeven
 Dayán Viciedo
 Thyago Vieira
 Ken Vining
 Rube Vinson
 Luis Vizcaíno
 Omar Vizquel
 Chris Volstad
 Fritz Von Kolnitz
 Bill Voss
 Pete Vuckovich

W

 Jake Wade
 Leon Wagner
 Don Wakamatsu
 Dixie Walker
 Gee Walker
 Greg Walker
 Kevin Walker
 Jack Wallaesa
Ed Walsh *
 Ed Walsh Jr.
 Steve Wapnick
 Aaron Ward
 Bryan Ward
 Pete Ward
 Claudell Washington
 George Washington
 Ehren Wassermann
 Johnny Watwood
 Bob Way
 Art Weaver
 Buck Weaver
 Floyd Weaver
 Daniel Webb
 Earl Webb
 Skeeter Webb
 Biggs Wehde
 Dave Wehrmeister
 Ralph Weigel
 Bob Weiland
 Ed Weiland
 Al Weis
 Mike Welday
 Casper Wells
 David Wells
 Kip Wells
 Leo Wells
 Sam West
 Don Wheeler
 Wes Whisler
 Doc White
 Ed White
 Rick White
 John Whitehead
 Frank Whitman
 Chris Widger
 Al Widmar
 Jack Wieneke
 Bill Wight
 Randy Wiles
Hoyt Wilhelm
 Andy Wilkins
 Roy Wilkinson
 Jerry Willard
 Eddie Williams
 Kenny Williams
 Lefty Williams
 Randy Williams
 Walt Williams
 Al Williamson
 Hugh Willingham
 Carl Willis
 Jim Willoughby
 Ted Wills
 Kid Willson
 Bill Wilson
 Craig Wilson
 George Wilson
 Jim Wilson
 Red Wilson
 Roy Wilson
 Jim Winn
 Kettle Wirts
 Archie Wise
 DeWayne Wise
 Polly Wolfe
 Mellie Wolfgang
 Wilbur Wood
 Mike Woodard
 Frank Woodward
 Rich Wortham
 Al Worthington
 Cy Wright
 Dan Wright
 Glenn Wright
 Taffy Wright
 Tom Wright
 Rick Wrona
 Kelly Wunsch
 Whit Wyatt
Early Wynn
 Billy Wynne

Y

 Hugh Yancy
 George Yankowski
 Yam Yaryan
 Michael Ynoa
 Rudy York
 Kevin Youkilis
 Irv Young

Z

 Dom Zanni
 Al Zarilla
 Seby Zavala
 Rollie Zeider
 Gus Zernial
 Richie Zisk
 Bob Zupcic
 Dutch Zwilling

External links
 BR batting statistics
 BR pitching statistics

Roster
Major League Baseball all-time rosters